Vanuatu Cricket Ground is a cricket ground in Port Vila, Vanuatu. It hosted the 2022–23 ICC Men's T20 World Cup East Asia-Pacific Qualifier tournament in September 2022. The 2022 Women's T20I Pacific Cup in October 2022 was the first women's T20I tournament held Vanuatu.

References

Cricket grounds in Vanuatu
Sport in Vanuatu
Port Vila